Trackers is a South African crime thriller series produced by Three River Fiction and Scene23. It is an adaptation of Deon Meyer's 2011 novel of the same name, and it was adapted for television by Robert Thorogood, leading a team of South African writers. It is the first co-production between South Africa pay-TV channel M-Net, HBO's sister network Cinemax and German public broadcaster ZDF. Warner Bros. Worldwide Television Distribution also distributes the series worldwide, with the exception of MultiChoice and ZDF's territories of broadcasts, respectively.

Before the last episode aired, M-Net announced that Trackers was already their best-performing show of 2019.

On April 17, 2020, it was announced that the series will premiere in the U.S. on June 5, 2020 on Cinemax.

Cast

Main
Milla Strachan (Rolanda Marais)

A 40-year-old woman who finds the courage to leave her abusive husband, her resentful son and a life of luxury. She struggles to find work in a job market that has moved on. Her journalism degree secures her a research job as an analyst in a government agency.

Lemmer (James Gracie)

A former Special Forces member and ministerial bodyguard. Lemmer resides in Loxton (a small town in the Karoo) after a failed intelligence operation led to the termination of his employment. He focuses his time on fixing up an old house and resolving his anger issues.

Janina Mentz (Sandi Schultz)

The Presidential Bureau of Intelligence (PBI) Director who diligently protects South African citizens. She was active in the country's liberation struggle and is against corruption and anyone who undermines the country's independence. An operational mistake in her past now threatens the future of her bureau.

Quinn Makebe (Thapelo Mokoena)

As COO of the PBI, Quinn is vying for Janina's position while working closely as her second-in-command. Even though he's considered clever, educated and ambitious, Janina questions his intentions.

Flea van Jaarsveld (Trix Vivier)

An expert wildlife tracker with a checkered past.

Additional
Diederick Brand (Deon Lotz)

A local businessman with criminal connections.

Barkatulla 'Baboo' Rayan (Kaseran Pillay)

A local man hosting the meeting in the Bo-Kaap between the local terrorist cell and Al-Qaeda.

Suleiman Daoud (Emmanuel Castis)

The Allajna (The Committee), a key representative and suspected Islamic terrorist wanted by the PBI.

Shaheed Osman (Brendon Daniels)

The local terrorist cell leader planning the attack along with Hamadei and Garba. He meets with Daoud as part of the plan to secure what is needed for their next target.

Hassan Hamadei (Stefan Erasmus)

A member of the terrorist cell along with Osman.

Abdullah Garba (Fabian Edeoye Lojede)

A member of the terrorist cell along with Osman.

Inkunzi Shabangu (Sisanda Henna)

A local criminal hired by Osman to hijack the truck transporting the black rhinos.

Lucas Becker (Ed Stoppard)

Becker is a CIA operative on a covert mission.

Ismail Daniels (Adrian Alper)

A PBI confidential informant, who first notifies Quinn Makebe about the planned terrorist plot.

Episodes

Reception
The review aggregator website Rotten Tomatoes reported an 83% approval rating for the first season with an average rating of 6/10, based on 6 reviews.

Note and references

External links

2019 South African television series debuts
South African drama television series
2010s crime drama television series
English-language television shows
Thriller television series
Serial drama television series
Espionage television series
Spy thriller television series
M-Net original programming
Murder in television
Television shows set in South Africa
Television shows set in Johannesburg, South Africa
Television shows filmed in South Africa
Television shows set in Africa
German drama television series
American drama television series
Television shows filmed in Zimbabwe
Television shows about crime
Television shows set in Cape Town
2020 German television series debuts
2020 American television series debuts